Eois biradiata is a moth in the family Geometridae. It is found in Colombia and Ecuador.

References

Moths described in 1911
Eois
Moths of South America